The 2001 NRL season was the 94th season of professional rugby league football in Australia and the fourth run by the National Rugby League.  Also called the 2001 Telstra Premiership (due to sponsorship from Telstra Corporation) it was contested by thirteen Australia-based clubs plus one New Zealand-based club. The Newcastle Knights claimed their second premiership in five seasons, defeating minor premiers Parramatta Eels in the NRL's first ever night-time grand final.

Season summary
Early in the season NRL matches involving the Bulldogs were marred by off-field violence from the club's supporters.

The Parramatta Eels looked set to break their fifteen-year premiership drought as they compiled one of the most dominant season records in rugby league history, losing just four of their 26 regular season games with the League's best attack and defensive record. In 2001 they established the standing record for most points by a club in a season with 943, blitzing the Brisbane Broncos' previous record tally of 871 set in 1998.  The Eels tally was significantly contributed to by Jason Taylor, who that year surpassed Daryl Halligan's mark of 2,034 to become the greatest point-scorer in the history of club competition in Australia.

The Warriors made the finals for the first time in their seven-year history under rookie coach Daniel Anderson, but were hammered 56-12 by the aforementioned minor premiers.

After Warren Ryan retired in 2000, the Newcastle Knights appointed former player Michael Hagan to the coaching position. Hagan proceeded to become the first coach since Phil Gould in 1988 to win a premiership in his first season as coach. Ricky Stuart would follow suit with the Roosters the following season. Tim Sheens was sacked as the coach of the North Queensland Cowboys during the season and was replaced by Murray Hurst. Mal Meninga resigned as Canberra coach following the club's disappointing season and in turn was replaced by Matthew Elliott.

Preston Campbell was a deserved winner of the Dally M medal after being an instrumental player in the Sharks' rise to fourth position on the table. Newcastle's Andrew Johns would have been clear winner but was not in contention due to missing two matches through suspension. Brian Smith was recognised as Coach of the Year whilst Braith Anasta won Rookie of the Year.

It was during the 2001 finals series that the new NRL Telstra Premiership logo was used, first seen on the field in the first qualifying final between the Sharks and the Broncos. That logo was to be used until the end of the 2006 season. Coincidentally, the Brisbane Broncos were also involved in the last match to use that logo, albeit in a modified finals version seen on the ground in the 2006 NRL Grand Final.

At the end of the season a squad of players from the NRL premiership went on the 2001 Kangaroo tour.

Every team except Penrith played at least one drawn match during the course of the season. The Bulldogs had three drawn matches, the most of any team during the season.

Teams
Auckland were renamed the New Zealand Warriors for the 2001 season.

Advertising
With a new CEO in David Moffat from 2000 the NRL late that year moved their account to a new advertising agency in Saatchi & Saatchi Sydney.

There was no umbrella campaign in 2001, no season launch gala ad. NRL Marketing Director, Mark Wallace insisted that the League's marketing budget remained the same as in prior years but that the focus was to be on promoting individual games and complementing the clubs' own marketing activities.

An ad was produced to promote certain key games. The scene is a deserted, eerie CBD street. The sound of a squeaky wheel gets louder until a clown rides into the middle of shot on a tricycle and turns to camera pouting and frowning. The voice over comes up: "This Easter long weekend the Dragons v Roosters at Sydney Football Stadium. You'd be a clown to miss it".

Regular season

Records and statistics
Parramatta Eels scored the most points in a season by any club in history scoring 839 points in total.
Wendell Sailor ran 4,452 metres with the ball in 2001, more than any other player in the competition.
On July 5, the Melbourne Storm beat the Wests Tigers 64-0, which is the Storm's biggest ever win and Tigers biggest ever loss. The very next day the Newcastle Knights beat the Brisbane Broncos 44-0, which was set at the time, the Broncos biggest ever loss at the time.
In round 23, Wests Tigers recorded their biggest comeback when they came from a 24-0 down after 30 minutes of play to win 36-32 against the Newcastle Knights which is the Knights worst collapse. Also equalled the second biggest ever comeback.

Ladder

Finals series
To decide the grand finalists from the top eight finishing teams, the NRL adopted the McIntyre final eight system.

Chart

Grand Final

The 2001 NRL grand final was the conclusive and premiership-deciding game of the 2001 NRL season. It was contested at Stadium Australia in Sydney by the Newcastle Knights (who had finished the regular season in third place), and the Parramatta Eels (who had finished the regular season in first place), after the other six teams that had competed in the top-eight finals series had been eliminated. The attendance of 90,414 was the third-highest ever seen at a rugby league match in Australia and it was the first nighttime grand final in the competition’s 103-year history. Domestically, live free-to-air television coverage was provided by Nine's Wide World of Sports. The match was also broadcast live in the United States by Fox Sports World. Newcastle Knights won, with their captain Andrew Johns receiving the Clive Churchill Medal for man-of-the-match.

Player statistics
The following statistics are as of the conclusion of Round 26.

Top 5 point scorers

Top 5 try scorers

Top 5 goal scorers

2001 Transfers

Players

Footnotes

External links
 2001 NRL Grand Final at sportsphotography.net